Adaklu is a town in the Adaklu District of Volta Region of Ghana. The town is known for the Adaklu Commercial Secondary School.  The school is a second cycle institution.

References

Adaklu is not a town, but a district in the Volta region of Ghana comprising about 45 towns.
Agortime Kpetoe and Ziofe are towns in Adaklu.  History attests to that fact.

Populated places in the Volta Region